Allgadda Assembly constituency is a constituency of the Andhra Pradesh Legislative Assembly, India. It is one of 7 constituencies in the Nandyal district.

Gangula Brijendra Reddy (Gangula Nani) is the present MLA of the constituency, who won the 2019 Andhra Pradesh Legislative Assembly election from YSR Congress Party.

Overview 
It is part of the Nandyal Lok Sabha constituency along with another six Vidhan Sabha segments, namely, Srisailam, Nandikotkur, Panyam, Nandyal, Banaganapalle and Dhone in Kurnool district.

Mandals

Members of Legislative Assembly Allagadda

Election results

Assembly Elections 2004

Assembly Elections 2009

Assembly elections 2014

Assembly Elections 2019

See also 
 List of constituencies of Andhra Pradesh Legislative Assembly

References 

Assembly constituencies of Andhra Pradesh